, also known as The Man Who Stole the Sun, is a 1979 Japanese political satire spy film, directed by Hasegawa Kazuhiko and written by Leonard Schrader.

Plot
Makoto Kido, a high school science and chemistry teacher, has decided to build his own atomic bomb. Before stealing plutonium isotopes from Tōkai Nuclear Power Plant, he is involved in the botched hijack of one of his school's buses during a field trip.  Along with a police detective, Yamashita, he is able to overcome the hijacker and is publicly hailed as a hero.

Meanwhile, Makoto is able to extract enough plutonium from his stolen isotopes to create two bombs—one genuine, the other containing only enough radioactive material to be detectable, but otherwise a fake.  He plants the fake bomb in a public lavatory and phones the police and demands that Yamashita take the case.  Since Makoto speaks to the police through a voice scrambler, Yamashita is unaware that Makoto is behind the whole thing.

Makoto manages to extort the government into showing baseball games without cutting away for commercials.  Flush with success, he follows a suggestion by a radio personality, nicknamed "Zero",  to use the real bomb to extort the government into allowing the Rolling Stones to play in Japan (despite being barred from doing so due to Keith Richards being arrested for narcotics possession).  The request is soon granted and the band eventually plays in Tokyo.

As Makoto makes his way to the concert with the bomb, Yamashita follows him. Makoto pulls out a gun and forces Yamashita to a rooftop. Makoto reveals that he was the extortionist, and gets into a fight with Yamashita. Eventually the two fall from the roof whilst Makoto holds on to the bomb. He is saved by grabbing on to a power line as Yamashita falls to his death. Still in possession of the bomb, Makoto decides to leave. As he walks away, a ticking sound, then an explosion is heard.

Cast
 Kenji Sawada as Makoto Kido
 Bunta Sugawara as Inspector Yamashita
 Kimiko Ikegami as Zero Sawai
 Kazuo Kitamura as Tanaka
 Shigeru Kôyama as Nakayama
 Kei Satō as Dr. Ichikawa

Themes
Many elements of the film are similar to Dr. Strangelove or: How I Learned to Stop Worrying and Love the Bomb—namely, the satirical treatment of the proliferation of nuclear weapons.  The film's specific area of satire is nuclear terrorism, which, as in the previous film, was a subject largely considered unsatirizeable.  Several scenes in the film are considered controversial, such as a moment where Makoto uses scraps of plutonium metal to poison people in a public swimming pool.  The film had a particular resonance for Japanese audiences; while Japan does use nuclear power, the country has long held against maintaining a nuclear arsenal especially in the aftermath of the bombings of Hiroshima and Nagasaki.

Much of the first hour of the film's running time is taken up with a highly technical depiction of Makoto building his homemade nuclear weapon, although key steps in the bomb-making process have apparently been omitted in the name of public safety.

The film won the Tokyo Blue Ribbon Award for Best Film of the Year in 1980, and was a critical and financial success in Japan on its release.  It has only been released outside Japan on home video.

In 1986, the American film The Manhattan Project concerned a highly intelligent young man who makes his own atomic weapon.

Awards

Wins
 Best Supporting Actor—Bunta Sugawara, Japan Academy Prize
 Best Film—Hochi Film Awards
 Best Actor—Kenji Sawada, Hochi Film Awards
 Best Japanese Director—Kazuhiko Hasegawa, Kinema Junpo Awards
 Best Director—Kazuhiko Hasegawa, Mainichi Film Award
 Readers' Choice Award—Kazuhiko Hasegawa, Mainichi Film Award
 Best Film, Yokohama Film Festival
 Best Director—Kazuhiko Hasegawa, Yokohama Film Festival

Nominations

Japan Academy Prize
 Best Film
 Best Actor—Kenji Sawada
 Best Director—Kazuhiko Hasegawa
 Best Art Direction—Yoshinaga Yokoo
 Best Cinematography—Tatsuo Suzuki
 Best Lighting—Hideo Kumagai
 Best Sound—Kenichi Benitani

References

External links
 
 

1970s action films
1970s buddy films
1979 comedy-drama films
1970s police comedy films
1970s political films
1970s spy comedy films
1970s spy films
1979 films
Anti-nuclear films
Anti-war films
Cold War films
Cold War spy films
Cultural depictions of Jimmy Carter
Cultural depictions of Leonid Brezhnev
Cultural depictions of the Rolling Stones
Films set in Asia
Films set in Japan
Films set in Tokyo
Japanese action films
Japanese comedy-drama films
Japanese political films
Japanese political satire films
Japanese satirical films
1970s Japanese-language films
Police detective films
Political action films
Political drama films
Toho films
Universal Pictures films
1979 comedy films
1979 drama films
1970s Japanese films
Japanese spy films